The ATP5MC1 gene is one of three human paralogs that encode membrane subunit c of the mitochondrial ATP synthase.

Function 

This gene encodes a subunit of mitochondrial ATP synthase. Mitochondrial ATP synthase catalyzes ATP synthesis, utilizing an electrochemical gradient of protons across the inner membrane during oxidative phosphorylation. ATP synthase is composed of two linked multi-subunit complexes: the soluble catalytic core, F1, and the membrane-spanning component, Fo, comprising the proton channel. The catalytic portion of mitochondrial ATP synthase consists of 5 different subunits (alpha, beta, gamma, delta, and epsilon) assembled with a stoichiometry of 3 alpha, 3 beta, and a single representative of the other 3. The proton channel seems to have nine subunits (a, b, c, d, e, f, g, F6 and 8). This gene is one of three genes that encode subunit c of the proton channel. Each of the three genes have distinct mitochondrial import sequences but encode the identical mature protein. Alternatively spliced transcript variants encoding the same protein have been identified.

References

External links

Further reading